Bestial Devastation is an EP by Brazilian heavy metal band Sepultura, released in 1985 through Cogumelo Records. It is their first official release, and originally appeared alongside Overdose's Século XX as a split album. The EP's songs were later released as bonus tracks on the CD version of Morbid Visions.

Production values
Because of Sepultura's collective lack of money, most of the instruments used on Bestial Devastation were borrowed from friends and acquaintances.

The vocals on the introductory track "The Curse" were performed by a friend of the band; according to Igor Cavalera:

The band apparently fought with the producer during the recording. In an interview, Igor Cavalera said, "He wanted to clean everything up in the mix and we finally had to play him some records by Venom to show him that bands sounded this way."

Overview
Months prior to recording what would eventually become the Bestial Devastation EP, the band decided to switch their lyrics from Portuguese to English. None of the band members knew how to write or speak the language, so they asked their friend Lino to translate their lyrics. An example of Lino's crude translation skills can be seen in one of the verses of the song "Antichrist":

Reception

Bestial Devastation was released in December 1985, alongside Overdose's Século XX EP. Over the next few months it sold 8,000 copies. Sepultura's surprising success was partly attributed to the first Rock in Rio, which took place in Rio de Janeiro in January 1985. This music festival's line-up included Whitesnake, AC/DC, Iron Maiden, Queen, Ozzy Osbourne and the Scorpions, and was responsible for Brazil's hard rock/heavy metal boom.

The EP was later reissued by Roadrunner Records on one CD with Morbid Visions in 1997. The reissue included a demo version of the song "Necromancer" that was the first studio recording of the band, and a live version of "Antichrist" from the Chaos A.D. tour, re-written as "Anticop".

Track listing
Bestial Devastation

Século XX

Credits

Sepultura
Max "Possessed" Cavalera – vocals, rhythm guitar
Jairo "Tormentor" Guedz – lead guitar, bass (uncredited)
Paulo "Destructor" Jr. – bass (credited, but did not perform)
Igor "Skullcrusher" Cavalera – drums, percussion

Additional notes
Recorded and mixed in two days on 8 tracks in August 1985 at J. G. Estudios, Belo Horizonte, Brazil
Produced by Sepultura
Back cover photo by Vânia Cavalera
Remastered for the Roadrunner Records release by Michael Sarsfield at Frankford/Wayne, New York, USA

Notes

References
 Barcinski, André & Gomes, Silvio (1999). Sepultura: Toda a História. São Paulo: Ed. 34. 
 Sepultura (1986). Morbid Visions. [CD]. New York, NY: Roadrunner Records. The Sepultura Remasters (1997).

1985 EPs
Sepultura EPs
Black metal EPs